Sant Llorenç des Cardassar is a small municipality on Mallorca, one of the Balearic Islands, Spain.

History
The  was built in the 17th century. Sant Llorenç des Cardassar was part of the municipality of Manacor, until 1892.

Sant Llorenç des Cardassar was the tragic scene of flash floods on the night of 9 October 2018, in which 13 people died. Some 400 troops of the Spanish Army, Civil Guard, firemen, local police and Civil Protection were mobilized to help trapped people and locate those missing. More than 200 people slept in shelters that were set up for those affected.

Geography
The municipality, on the eastern coast of the island of Mallorca, adjoins the municipalities of Manacor, Petra, Artà and Son Servera. On the coast, within the municipality, are Sa Coma, the northern part of s'Illot and the southern part of Cala Millor, which are all beachside tourist areas. The , a headland at the eastern end of the municipality, separates the beaches of Cala Millor and Sa Coma.

Demography

Transport

Roads
The , the main road from Palma, acts as a bypass around the southern and eastern sides of the town centre of Sant Llorenç, continuing north through Artà. The Ma-4030 road connects the town centre of Sant Llorenç with Son Servera, to the east.

Media
The ITV2 series Love Island is filmed on the outskirts of the town.

Notable people
Margarita Fullana, a mountain biker who won a bronze medal at the 2000 Summer Olympics in Sydney, was born in the municipality.

References

External links

Official site (in Catalan)
Sant Llorenç des Cardassar toruist guide

Municipalities in Mallorca
Populated places in Mallorca